Warhammer 40,000: Gladius – Relics of War is a turn-based strategy 4X video game developed by Proxy Studios and published by Slitherine Software for Windows and Linux on July 12, 2018. It is based on Games Workshop's tabletop wargame Warhammer 40,000.

Gameplay
Gladius – Relics of War is a turn-based strategy 4X game played on a hex grid, set on an imperial world of Gladius in the Warhammer 40,000 universe. There are four races to choose from: Imperial Guard, Space Marines, Orks, or Necrons. There is no diplomacy, a departure from a typical 4X game. The multiplayer supports hotseat mode.

Release
Gladius – Relics of War was announced on November 27, 2017. Several downloadable content (DLC) packs have been released for the game.

Reception

Gladius – Relics of War received "mixed or average" reviews according to review aggregator Metacritic.

Leana Hafer of IGN said that "[w]hile it didn’t wow me as a competitor to Endless Legend or Civ 6 in the 4X race, there’s a lot of action-saturated, tactically-driven fun to be had when you look at Gladius - Relics of war for what it truly is: a really well-done, turn-based 40K wargame. It’s one of the best turn-based 40K games I’ve played through that lens."

Tom Senior of PC Gamer summarized that the game is "[a] plodding and predictable 4X strategy game that's relaxing in its own way, but rarely challenging."

Davide Pessach of Eurogamer gave seven out of ten to the Tyranids expansion.

See also
Pandora: First Contact, the previous 4X game by the same developer and publisher

References

External links

2018 video games
4X video games
Linux games
Multiplayer and single-player video games
Multiplayer hotseat games
Multiplayer online games
Slitherine Software games
Turn-based strategy video games
Video games developed in Germany
Video games with downloadable content
Video games with expansion packs
Gladius
Windows games
Proxy Studios games